Kimberly Ann Caldwell-Harvey is an American singer, actress and television hostess.  She rose to fame when she was a finalist on the second season of American Idol. After her American Idol stint, Caldwell was an entertainment correspondent and hosted various shows on the TV Guide Network. She released her debut album Without Regret on April 19, 2011.

Biography

Early life
Caldwell first sang publicly at age five in beauty pageants. She was a five-time junior vocalist winner on Star Search, and she also performed at the Grand Ole Opry. In 1995, she sang at the 50th wedding anniversary of former President George H. W. Bush and Barbara Bush. Caldwell also appeared on the second and final season of Popstars: USA, where she was rejected from the group and told she would do better as a solo vocalist.

Following her run on the second season of American Idol, Caldwell started working as a correspondent for the entertainment/extreme sports program 54321 on FOX Sports Network. She covered various events and movie premieres for the show before joining her fellow Season 2 Idol finalists on the road for the American Idols LIVE! tour, which played in 44 cities across the United States.

Recent projects
In 2008, Caldwell released two singles, "Fear of Flying" and "Gave Yourself Away". She also began filming a TV Series  in 2010 called Twentysixmiles aka Catalina Island miniseries with John Schneider, as well as hosting a television game show (created by Mark Burnett) called Jingles.

Caldwell will be the host of a new MTV show called P. Diddy's Starmaker, set to premiere in January 2009 on MTV. Both male and female aspiring solo artists will compete against each other through weekly performances, and have the added challenge of living together. The show is produced by Mark Burnett and Sean "P. Diddy" Combs.

On the 2009 New Year's Day edition of Deal or No Deal, Kimberly was a supporter for her hometown friend Tunde Oyeneyin, who ended up winning $110,000 in cash ($100,000 from Oyeneyin's case, $10,000 from a New Year's side game), and a car valued at $45,190.

On May 21, 2009 Caldwell announced she had just signed a record deal with Vanguard Records and her debut album was due to hit stores sometime in 2010. Shortly after, Vanguard Records had entered into a joint venture with EMI Music Group. Therefore, Caldwell is now under both labels of Vanguard and Capitol Records.

In December 2009, she released her first single "Mess of You" from her debut album which will be released through Vanguard/Capitol.

On April 13, 2011 her debut album was released and it sold 3,000 copies its first week.

In 2012, Caldwell is hosting the Oxygen Network series Best Ink.

Personal life

In 2006 her first single "Who Will You Run To" was released. A song written by Diane Warren and originally recorded by the band Heart. This single was released on Story Road Records and was recorded at Radio Recorders Studios by Jordan Winsen and mixed by Chris Henry.

In May 2008, Caldwell was asked out on a date by American Idol winner David Cook while on the red carpet before the show's seventh-season finale.  Their relationship lasted until January 12, 2009, when rumors of a breakup with Cook were confirmed by Caldwell's rep, who stated in In Touch magazine: "Kimberly and David ended their relationship just before the holidays. The couple remain good friends and being very private people, appreciate their privacy at this time."

Caldwell was featured on the August 25, 2010 episode of LA Ink, where she received a tattoo on her back of lyrics from her song "With You I Can".

On June 18, 2011, Caldwell was crowned "Queen of Don't H8" at Nashville Pride, a title handed to her in honor of her work with the LGBT community.

Caldwell got engaged to professional soccer player Jordan Harvey, having met him in Philadelphia when he played for the Philadelphia Union. They were married on December 31, 2014 in Palm Springs, California.  Their daughter, Harlow Monroe Harvey, was born on October 7, 2015. Their second daughter, Houston Mae Harvey, was born on February 18, 2020.

Career

Without Regret (2010–present)

On May 21, 2009 Caldwell announced she had just signed a record deal, and her debut album Without Regret would hit stores on April 6, 2010. She later announced that the album would be delayed until July due to the addition of new songs. It was later announced that Without Regret would be delayed yet again with the release date being set for December 31. The album was finally released on April 19, 2011, over a year after the original release date. Caldwell co-wrote the song Tacking Back My Life with Brett Epstein.

In December 2009, she released her first single "Mess of You", and in December 2010, she released "Desperate Girls & Stupid Boys". The video for "Desperate Girls & Stupid Boys" premiered on January 18, 2011 on VEVO.

Discography

Studio albums

Singles

Filmography

Film

Television

Music videos

References

External links

Living people
20th-century American singers
American television reporters and correspondents
Actresses from Texas
American child singers
American Idol participants
American film actresses
Beauty pageant contestants from Texas
Singers from Texas
People from Katy, Texas
Vanguard Records artists
Journalists from Texas
20th-century American women singers
21st-century American women singers
21st-century American singers
American women television journalists
Year of birth missing (living people)